Benjamin Montmorency "Benmont" Tench III (born September 7, 1953) is an American musician and singer, and a founding member of Tom Petty and the Heartbreakers.

Early years

Tench was born in Gainesville, Florida, the second child of Benjamin Montmorency Tench Jr. and Mary Catherine McInnis Tench. His father was born and raised in the city of Gainesville, and served as a circuit court judge.

Tench played piano from an early age. His first recital was at age six. After discovering the music of The Beatles, he ended his classical piano lessons and focused on rock and roll. At age 11, he met Tom Petty for the first time at a Gainesville music store. Petty and Tench played together as members of The Sundowners in 1964. The Tench family's garage was a frequent practice site for the band.

Education
He attended Phillips Exeter Academy, and subsequently Tulane University in New Orleans.  While on a college break, Tench went to a concert by Mudcrutch, Petty's band, with an opening act from nearby Jacksonville, Lynyrd Skynyrd. Afterwards, he sat in with the band on several different sessions, then went back to school. Soon after, Petty called Tench and asked him to quit school and join Mudcrutch full-time, which after long deliberation, Tench agreed to; but before he would leave school, Petty had to convince Tench's father that his son had a promising music career.

Music career
Mudcrutch eventually evolved into Tom Petty and the Heartbreakers.

In addition to playing piano and Hammond organ with the Heartbreakers, Tench is also a session musician, having recorded with dozens of notable artists.

Songs written by Tench and recorded by other artists include "You Little Thief", a top 5 UK and Australian hit for Feargal Sharkey in 1985, and "Never Be You" (co-written with Petty), which was featured on the Streets of Fire soundtrack album and became a #1 US Country hit for Rosanne Cash, also in 1985. Tench has received two ASCAP songwriting awards: in 1995 for "Stay Forever" (performed by Hal Ketchum) and in 2001 for "Unbreakable Heart" (performed by Jessica Andrews). This was also recorded by Carlene Carter in the early 1990s. He also wrote songs for Kimmie Rhodes ("Play Me A Memory") and Lone Justice ("Sweet, Sweet Baby (I'm Falling)").

Other bands and solo career
In 2008, Tench became part of a supergroup, initially named The Scrolls, now officially known as Works Progress Administration (W.P.A.). The band is composed of Tench, Sean Watkins (guitar), Sara Watkins (fiddle), Glen Phillips (guitar, vocals), Luke Bulla (fiddle), Greg Leisz (various), Pete Thomas (drums), and Davey Faragher (bass). The group released a self-titled album in September 2009.  Tench penned one of the songs on the album, named "The Price," sung by Sara Watkins and himself.

Tench has worked extensively with other musicians, playing keyboards on hundreds of songs on albums such as Stevie Nicks' Bella Donna, Bob Dylan's Shot of Love, along with other musical greats such as  Johnny Cash, Roy Orbison, Alanis Morissette, Eurythmics, Fiona Apple, U2, X (American band) among many more.

In 2009, Tench frequently appeared with the Watkins Family Hour at Largo at the Coronet in Los Angeles. He has also appeared at the Largo and at the Fillmore in San Francisco as a special guest with Gillian Welch and David Rawlings, and accompanied the Dave Rawlings Machine on part of their west coast tour in spring 2010. In 2015, the Watkins Family Hour released their debut album and went on a national tour.

In 2014, Tench released his first solo album, titled You Should Be So Lucky. Tench also added keyboard parts to Stevie Nicks' album 24 Karat Gold: Songs from the Vault.

In 2016, he played the Fleetwood Mac tribute at the Fonda Theater, in Los Angeles; he performed the song "Silver Springs" with Courtney Love. Tench also appears on the bill for a tribute to the band Big Star that took place in Los Angeles, California, in April 2016 (together with members of R.E.M, Wilco and Semisonic).
Tench also reunited with Mudcrutch to record the band's second album, Mudcrutch 2. The band embarked on their American tour on May 26, 2016.

In March 2019, Tench played three shows with Phil Lesh & Friends at the Capitol Theatre in Port Chester, New York. He also played on three songs from The Who's album WHO, released in December 2019.

Personal life
In 1991, Tench married Canadian model Courtney Taylor. They divorced in late 1999. In 2015, Tench married his second wife, author Alice Carbone Tench. Their daughter Catherine Gabriella Winter was born on December 16, 2017.

Discography

Solo 
Studio album
 You Should Be So Lucky (2014)

Other studio appearance

 The Mermaid Song" from More Music from The Rum Diary (2012)

Live EP

 Nervous from the Fall (2019)

Session 
 Bella Donna - Stevie Nicks (1981)
 Shot of Love - Bob Dylan (1981)
 I Can't Stand Still - Don Henley (1982)
 The Wild Heart - Stevie Nicks (1983)
 Building the Perfect Beast - Don Henley (1984)
 Lone Justice - Lone Justice (1985)
 Empire Burlesque - Bob Dylan (1985)
 Who's Zoomin' Who? - Aretha Franklin (1985)
 Rock a Little - Stevie Nicks (1985)
 Knocked Out Loaded - Bob Dylan (1986)
 The Knife Feels Like Justice - Brian Setzer (1986)
 The Sound of Music - The dB's (1987)
 Sentimental Hygiene - Warren Zevon (1987)
 Two Stories - Williams Brothers (1987)
 Mystery Girl - Roy Orbison (1989)
 The Man with the Blue Post-Modern Fragmented Neo-Traditionalist Guitar - Peter Case (1989)
 Full Moon Fever - Tom Petty (1989)
 Transverse City - Warren Zevon (1989)
 Back from Rio - Roger McGuinn (1991)
 The Missing Years - John Prine (1991)
 Night Calls - Joe Cocker (1991)
 Reckoning - Christine Lakeland (1993) 
 Robin Zander - Robin Zander (1993)
 Blink of an Eye - Michael McDonald (1993)
 I'm Alive - Jackson Browne (1993)
 Rumble Doll - Patti Scialfa (1993)
 Wildflowers - Tom Petty (1994)
 Looking East - Jackson Browne (1996)
 Unchained - Johnny Cash (1996)
 Dust - Screaming Trees (1996)
 We Ran - Linda Ronstadt (1998)
 Inside Job - Don Henley (2000)
 American III: Solitary Man - Johnny Cash (2000)
 Trouble in Shangri-La - Stevie Nicks (2001)
 American IV: The Man Comes Around - Johnny Cash (2002)
 Tambourine - Tift Merritt (2004)
 12 Songs - Neil Diamond (2005)
 Taking the Long Way - Dixie Chicks (2006)
 American V: A Hundred Highways (2006)
 Highway Companion - Tom Petty (2006)
 Home Before Dark - Neil Diamond (2008)
 Y Not - Ringo Starr (2010)
 Dreams - Neil Diamond (2010)
 Ringo 2012 - Ringo Starr (2012)
 24 Karat Gold: Songs from the Vault - Stevie Nicks (2014)
 Postcards From Paradise - Ringo Starr (2015)
 Give More Love - Ringo Starr (2017)
 What's My Name - Ringo Starr (2019)
 Who - The Who (2019)
 Starting Over - Chris Stapleton (2020)
 Zoom In - Ringo Starr (2021)

References

External Links
Benmont Tench Interview NAMM Oral History Library (2020)

1953 births
American rock keyboardists
Tom Petty and the Heartbreakers members
Living people
Musicians from Gainesville, Florida
Phillips Exeter Academy alumni
American session musicians
Mudcrutch members
American rock pianists
American male pianists
American organists
American male organists
20th-century American pianists
Tulane University alumni
21st-century American keyboardists
21st-century organists
Works Progress Administration (band) members
20th-century American keyboardists